Răzvan Gabriel Petrariu (born 27 March 1995) is a Romanian former professional footballer who played as a goalkeeper for teams such as FCM Bacău, SC Bacău or FC Voluntari.

References

External links
 
 

1995 births
Living people
Sportspeople from Bacău
Romanian footballers
Romania youth international footballers
Association football goalkeepers
Liga II players
FCM Bacău players
Liga I players
FC Voluntari players